Azipramine (TQ-86) is a tetracyclic antidepressant (TeCA) which was synthesized and assayed pharmacologically in animals in 1976, but was never marketed.

References 

Abandoned drugs
Amines
Tetracyclic antidepressants
Dibenzazepines
Heterocyclic compounds with 4 rings